Beddoe is a surname of Welsh origin. It originates from Bettws or Betws, a Welsh name that is derived from the Anglo-Saxon Old English bed-hus—i.e. a bead-house: a house of prayer, or oratory.
At the time of the British Census of 1881, its frequency was highest in Pembrokeshire (over 65 times the national average), followed by Cambridgeshire, Shropshire, Glamorgan, Monmouthshire, Herefordshire, Carmarthenshire, Staffordshire, Cardiganshire and Warwickshire. 

Notable people with the surname include:

 Martin Beddoe (born 1955), British judge
 Alan Beddoe (1893–1975), Canadian artist, consultant in heraldry, and founder of the Heraldry Society of Canada
 Clive Beddoe (born 1947), founding shareholder and chairman of the board of directors of WestJet Airlines
 Dan Beddoe (1863–1937), Welsh tenor
 Don Beddoe (1903–1991), American character actor
 John Beddoe (1826–1911), British ethnologist
 Valerie Beddoe (born 1960), Australian diver

Fictional characters
 Philo Beddoe, a character played by Clint Eastwood in the films Every Which Way But Loose and Any Which Way You Can

See also
 David Rowe-Beddoe, Baron Rowe-Beddoe, British politician and member of the House of Lords
 Beddoe Rees, British architect and politician
 Beddoe–Rose Family Cemetery, New York State
 Bedo (disambiguation)
 Beddoes

References

Surnames of Welsh origin
Welsh-language surnames